Plus-Tech Squeeze Box are a Japanese electronic music/shibuya-kei duo formed by Tomonori Hayashibe and Takeshi Wakiya.

The frenetic sound of their first album FAKEVOX (2000) is driven by rudimentary synthesized sounds and heavily manipulated samples from a variety of sources, including jazz, big band, light music, MOR, and funk recordings ranging from the late-50s to the mid-70s. Junko Kamada provides vocals throughout the album. 

Their second album, CARTOOOM!, was released in 2004. Junko Kamada is conspicuously absent, having parted ways with the band. Instead, sampled vocals and a variety of guest singers are used.

They created a side project with the vocalist Tomomi Matsuda called Tropico Q in 2010.  The group did covers of classic rock songs.

Notable appearances
They have been featured in Coca-Cola and Powerade commercials in the United Kingdom, using the song "early RISER". They also appeared on BBC Three's Adam and Joe Go Tokyo and for The SpongeBob SquarePants Movie – Music from the Movie and More.... One of their songs, including Baby P was featured on Pop'n Music 14 FEVER. They also wrote and recorded the theme tune for Pucca, which is similar to that of "early RISER". Their song "TEST ROOM" was featured in Dance Dance Revolution Universe in 2007.

Discography
FAKEVOX (2000)
CARTOOOM! (2004)

External links
 Official PSB website
 their label's website, STUBBIE RECORDS
 Clear and Refreshing Review
 Official HearJapan Page
 Side Project Tropico Q

Japanese rock music groups
Shibuya-kei musicians
Musical groups from Shibuya